Brosse or Brossé is a French family name. Notable people with the name include:

 Anthony Brosse (born 1980), French politician
 Charles-Léonce Brossé (1871–), French painter, engraver and lithographer
 Jean-Patrice Brosse (born 1950), French classical violinist
 Dirk Brossé (born 1960), Belgian conductor and composer
 Stéphane Brosse (1971–2012), French ski mountaineer

See also
 DeBrosse
 Bross

Surnames of French origin